Rore may refer to:

 Rore (lake), a lake in the municipalities of Grimstad and Arendal in Agder county, Norway
 Rore, Glamoč, a village in the municipality of Glamoč, Bosnia and Herzegovina
 Te Rore, an transhipment point on New Zealand's Waipā River

People 

 Robert C. Rore, a German artist and illustrator
 Katrina Rore, a New Zealand international netball player
 Cipriano de Rore, Italian composer of the Renaissance